South Health Campus (SHC) is a large hospital in Calgary, in Alberta, Canada. It is administered by Alberta Health Services.

The building was developed by Alberta Infrastructure, and the first phase was built at a cost of $1.31 billion. The South Health Campus was fully operational by 2016.  It has the capacity to handle 800,000 ambulatory visits per year, and it performs approximately 2,500 births every year.  It includes a 24-hour emergency department, an intensive care unit (ICU), as well as day surgery units.  Services are provided for a wide range of acute and chronic health conditions.  The facility currently serves 200,000 outpatients annually.

The entire facility (including planned future additions) has been designed for 2,400 full-time-equivalent staff, including 180 physicians, along with 644 inpatient beds and 11 operating rooms.

In terms of physical infrastructure, the building exterior colour scheme is designed to reflect the landscape hallmarks of prairie, forest, and clear blue sky.  This state-of-the-art concrete-and-steel complex has a floor area of one million square feet.  Emergency power is provided by a set of ten diesel generators with total power output of 28 megawatts.

Programs and Services
The facility offers a number of programs and services:
24 Hour Blood Pressure Monitoring Service
Addiction Services - Adolescent Outpatient
Advanced Venous Access Service
Amyotrophic Lateral Sclerosis Clinic
Anticoagulation Management Services
Atrial Fibrillation Clinic
Bone Clinic
Breast Health and Breast Reconstruction  
Bronchoscopy Services
Calgary Headache Assessment & Management Program
Cardiac Arrhythmia Service
Cardiac Devices ( Pacemaker and ICD) Services
Cardiology - Electrocardiogram Services
Cardiology - Inpatients
Cardiovascular Laboratories - Echocardiography
Cardiovascular Laboratories - Nuclear Cardiology
Cast Clinic
Clinical Neurophysiology Lab
Consultation Liaison Service - Mental Health
Day Surgery
Department of Family Medicine, Family Medicine Clinic
Diagnostic Imaging and Camera Services
Emergency Services
Endocrinology Services
Epilepsy Care Clinic
Exercise Stress Test
Gastrointestinal Services - Outpatients
General Internal Medicine Clinic
General Medicine - Inpatients
Hand Clinic
Heart Function Clinic
Hematology - Outpatients
Hepatology Clinic
Hip and Knee Clinic
Holter Monitoring
Home Parenteral Therapy Program
Infectious Diseases
Intensive Care Services - Critical Care Medicine
Internal Medicine Urgent Care Clinic
Interventional Radiology/Angiography
Laboratory Services
Medical Day Treatment
Minor Surgery Clinic
Mobile Response Team
Multiple Sclerosis Clinic
Neurology - Outpatients
Neurology - Inpatients
Neuromuscular Clinic
Orthopaedic Services - Inpatients
Orthopaedic Services - Outpatients
Patient E-mail Well Wishes
Plastic surgery consultation and surgical intervention
Post Anaesthetic Care Unit
Pre-Admission Clinic
Psychiatric Emergency Services
Psychiatry - Inpatient
Psychiatry Analysis 
Pulmonary Diagnostics Unit
Rapid Access Unit
Rheumatology - Outpatients
Surgical Outpatient Clinic
Transition Services - Acute Care
Urgent Neurology Clinic
Volunteer Resources

Alberta Health Services
The South Health Campus is one of twelve hospitals in the Calgary zone that has a population of 1,408,606 and an average life expectancy of 82.9 years.

Parking
The South Health Campus has three parking lots with payment options including passes: visitor/patient monthly ($85), weekly ($41), daily ($14.25) or half-hour ($2.00 per half hour or portion) with some discounts for seniors, etc., with authorization forms. A general monthly pass with no authorization form costs $125 if available. one of the lots is designated for Emergency parking.

Wellness Centre

The Wellness Centre  at the South Health Campus is home to many different programs and services such as a YMCA, Wellness Kitchen, and a Resource and Knowledge Centre. Includes a climbing wall with auto belay system, weight room with a track. The Facilities do not include a pool, courts, or steam room.

See also
Health care in Calgary
Health care in Canada
List of hospitals in Canada

References

External links
South Health Campus

Hospital buildings completed in 2013
Buildings and structures in Calgary
Hospitals in Calgary
Hospitals established in 2013
Heliports in Canada
Certified airports in Alberta
2013 establishments in Alberta